Charles- Amédée de Courson (born 2 April 1952 in Paris - 16th arrondissement) is a member of the National Assembly of France  and a former 'rapporteur', and current secretary of its Finance Commission. He represents the Marne department, and is a member of the Union of Democrats and Independents as part of the Centrists. Amongst his many interventions, he has opposed same-sex marriage, and has denounced the "illusion of security at airports".

References

1952 births
Living people
ESSEC Business School alumni
École nationale d'administration alumni
Politicians from Paris
Centre of Social Democrats politicians
Union for French Democracy politicians
The Centrists politicians
Union of Democrats and Independents politicians
Deputies of the 12th National Assembly of the French Fifth Republic
Deputies of the 13th National Assembly of the French Fifth Republic
Deputies of the 14th National Assembly of the French Fifth Republic
Deputies of the 15th National Assembly of the French Fifth Republic
Deputies of the 16th National Assembly of the French Fifth Republic
Members of Parliament for Marne